Angie Maria Beckwith (27 January 1881 – 2 October 1964) was an American phytopathologist, at the primary pathology laboratory at the USDA's Bureau of Plant Industry under Erwin F. Smith and Florence Hedges during the 1920s.

In 1921, Beckwith was one of more than twenty women who worked in Smith's lab, and who were credited with studying bacterial wilt in new dry beans. Among her cohort were several notable mycologists and botanists including Charlotte Elliot, Hellie A. Brown, Edith Cash, Mary Katharine Bryan, Anna Jenkins, and Lucia McCulloch, Pearle Smith.

She was a member of the Mycological Society of America and published regularly in the Bulletin of the Torrey Botanical Club.

References

American women botanists
20th-century American women scientists
1881 births
1964 deaths
American phytopathologists
Women phytopathologists
20th-century American botanists
United States Department of Agriculture people